Nadia María Calviño Santamaría (born 3 October 1968) is a Spanish economist and civil servant who serves as First Deputy Prime Minister of Spain since July 2021 and as Minister of Economy since 2018 under prime minister Pedro Sánchez. In 2020, her portfolio was renamed as Minister for Economic Affairs and Digital Transformation.

Calviño started her career in different positions within the Ministry of Economy and in 2006 she started to work for the European Commission. She worked in several directorates-general and in 2014 she was appointed Director-General for Budget (DG BUDG). She served as such until June 2018, when prime minister Pedro Sánchez appointed her as Minister of Economy and Business. In 2020, the prime minister promoted her to deputy prime minister.

Early life and education 
Nadia María Calviño Santamaría was born in A Coruña, Galicia, Spain on 3 October 1968. Her father, José María Calviño, was former director general of the Radio Televisión Española (RTVE). She graduated with a degree in economics in 1991 from the Complutense University of Madrid and a law degree in 2001 from the National University of Distance Education (UNED).

Career 
Calviño is a member of the Senior Corps of State Economists and Trade Advisors. In the Spanish administration, she served as general director of the National Competition Commission.

After more than a decade working in the Spanish Ministry of Economy, Calviño moved to the European Commission in 2006. There she held the posts of Deputy Director-General attached to the Directorate-General for Competition (DG COMP) and Deputy Director-General in the Directorate-General for Internal Market, Industry, Entrepreneurship and SMEs (DG MARKT), as well as Deputy Director-General in the Directorate-General for Financial Stability, Financial Services and Capital Markets Union.

From 2014 to 2018 Calviño served as Director-General for Budget, under the leadership of European Commissioner Günther Oettinger. She has also worked as a professor at the Complutense University.

Minister of Economy of Spain 
In June 2018 Calviño was chosen by Prime Minister Pedro Sánchez to be part of his new government as Minister of Economy and Business of Spain, following the motion of censure that the PSOE presented against the previous government of Mariano Rajoy (PP) and that was approved by the Congress of Deputies on 1 June 2018. Thus, on 7 June she took office as Minister of Economy and Business before the King at Palace of Zarzuela.

Following the resignation of Christine Lagarde as managing director of the International Monetary Fund (IMF) in 2019, Calviño was one of the candidates considered by European governments as potential successor; she withdrew after a first round of voting among representatives of the EU's 28 member states and the post went to Kristalina Georgieva instead.

Deputy prime minister
During the electoral debate of 5 November 2019, Pedro Sánchez announced that Calviño would be appointed economic vice-president if he were elected president, office she assumed as third deputy prime minister and Minister of Economic Affairs and Digital Transformation on 13 January 2020 before the King. On 31 March 2021, she was promoted to Second Deputy Prime Minister and on 12 July 2021 to First Deputy Prime Minister.

In this new stage, Calviño's powers on new technologies and digital transformation expanded, creating in her department new positions related to this affairs, such as the Secretary of State for Digitization and Artificial Intelligence.

COVID-19 
In early 2020, the COVID-19 pandemic expanded to Europe, reaching Spain in late January. In March, Calviño announced a 200-billion-euro package to fight the economic effects of coronavirus, which included loans and guarantees to self-employed and to small and medium-sized entreprises and large companies.

Although Calviño initially opted for Eurobonds, due to the reluctance of some European countries, she adopted a more pragmatic position and she proposed to use the European Stability Mechanism but without conditions, an option accepted by the European Council which allowed the unlocking of €500 billion funds to the most affected European states. However, Calviño stated that neither she nor the government renounced Eurobonds and that they will continue to work on them in the medium term.

In mid-April, Calviño proposed to its European counterparts a 1.5 trillion euro recovery fund, that would be financed through perpetual debt issued by the European institutions.

Eurogroup candidacy 

In mid-June 2020, rumors increased about a possible candidacy of Calviño to be the next president of Eurogroup. Spanish Prime Minister declared that Spain would be "very interested" on it. The Spanish government officially proposed Calviño on 25 June. Calviño quickly received the support of the majority of the opposition in the Spanish Parliament.

The first European government to show support to Calviño's candidature was the German government through its chancellor, Angela Merkel, who stated that "It is no secret that there is support for Nadia Calviño's candidature in the German government". She also added that she was "pleased when women get leading political roles, and the Eurogroup has never been headed by a woman.". On 28 June Portuguese PM António Costa also supported Calviño. On 8 July Italian PM Giuseppe Conte publicly supported her. A day later, French finance minister, Bruno Le Maire, did the same.

Voting took place on 9 July. As no candidate obtained an absolute majority in the first round, Calviño and Donohoe (with 9 and 5 votes, respectively) went to the second round after the withdrawal of Pierre Gramegna. In the second round Donohoe won the support of the majority of finance ministers, becoming Eurogroup president (10 votes to 9).

Bank consolidation 
In early September 2020, state-controlled bank Bankia and Caixabank announced that they were very close to a deal to merge both banks. That merge would have created the biggest domestic bank in Spain, surpassing Santander and BBVA. Unidas Podemos, the coalition partner of the second Sánchez government and its leader, Second Deputy Prime Minister Pablo Iglesias rejected the merger describing it as a "privatization" and criticized that Calviño never revealed to them the existence of this talks.

Calviño, whose signature was more than enough to authorize the merger, received the support of the prime minister, Pedro Sánchez, who described the merger as something "positive" for the Spanish economy and the "territorial cohesion" since the bank would extend its influence from two to four Spanish regions. Days later, Calviño described the banking consolidation as "probably inevitable" to keep the solvency and competitiveness of the banking sector in the future, but at the same time she warned that this type of operations should be carried out respecting competition and the interests of consumers and that the CNMC would be watching. On 17 September 2020 the boards of both banks approved the merger. The new bank, which maintains the Caixabank brand, has the Spanish government as the second largest shareholder, with 16.1% of the shares. In December 2020, Calviño defended before the Congressional Economic Affairs Committee that the merger was the best option for the "social interest" since it is the one that contributes the greatest value to investors, including the State, one of the main shareholders.

Apart from this merger, other mergers were negotiated that same year. On the one hand, BBVA and Sabadell broke off negotiations in November 2020 due to the impossibility of reaching an agreement. On the other hand, other minor banks such as Unicaja and Liberbank reached an agreement in December 2020 to create the fifth bank in the country. In March 2021, both banks approved the merger.

On 7 December 2021, she was proposed by the Eurogroup as the European candidate for the Presidency of the International Monetary and Financial Committee (IMFC), a position compatible with her post as minister of the Spanish government. She was elected for the post on 24 December.

Other activities

European Union organizations
 European Investment Bank (EIB), Ex-Officio Member of the Board of Governors (since 2018)
 European Stability Mechanism (ESM), Member of the Board of Governors (since 2018)

International organizations
 Asian Infrastructure Investment Bank (AIIB), Ex-Officio Member of the Board of Governors (since 2018)
 Central American Bank for Economic Integration (CABEI), Ex-Officio Member of the Board of Governors (since 2018)
 European Bank for Reconstruction and Development (EBRD), Ex-Officio Member of the Board of Governors (since 2018)
 Inter-American Investment Corporation (IIC), Ex-Officio Member of the Board of Governors (since 2018)  	
 International Monetary Fund (IMF), Ex-Officio Member of the Board of Governors (since 2018)
 Joint World Bank-IMF Development Committee, Member
 Multilateral Investment Guarantee Agency (MIGA), World Bank Group, Ex-Officio Member of the Board of Governors (since 2018)
 World Bank, Ex-Officio Member of the Board of Governors (since 2018)

Non-governmental organizations
 Elcano Royal Institute for International and Strategic Studies, Member of the Board of Trustees

Personal life 
Calviño is mother to four children. Among her hobbies are 1950s cinema and cooking. She speaks Spanish, Galician, English, French and German.

See also 
 List of Complutense University of Madrid alumni

External links
Biography by CIDOB (in Spanish)

References

|-

1968 births
21st-century Spanish politicians
21st-century Spanish women politicians
Complutense University of Madrid alumni
Deputy Prime Ministers of Spain
People from Galicia (Spain)
Politicians from Galicia (Spain)
Government ministers of Spain
Living people
People from A Coruña
Spanish economists
Economy and finance ministers of Spain
Spanish women economists
Academic staff of the Complutense University of Madrid
Women government ministers of Spain